Malek Ibrahim Hassoun (born 10 June 1975) is a Lebanese football manager and former player who is the head coach of  club Tadamon Sour. As a player, he played as a midfielder for Chabab Ghazieh, Ansar, and the Lebanon national team.

Club career 
Hassoun began his career at hometown club Chabab Ghazieh aged 13, joining Ansar on 5 May 1997. He became captain in 2002 following Jamal Taha's retirement, and played the rest of his career there, retiring in 2009. Hassoun played over 400 games in all competitions, scoring around 45 goals.

International career 
Hassoun represented the Lebanon national team between 1997 and 2004, scoring twice in 12 games.

Managerial career 
Hassoun began his managerial career as assistant coach of Lebanese Premier League side Ansar in 2009, under coach Jamal Taha. Following Taha's dismissal, he was appointed head coach on 7 April 2013, remaining until 30 April 2014.

Hassoun became head coach of Chabab Ghazieh in the Lebanese Premier League in November 2014; after avoiding relegation to the Lebanese Second Division, his contract was renewed for a further year on 28 May 2015. He resigned on 26 November 2015, after only gaining one point in the opening five matches of the 2015–16 season.

In December 2015, Hassoun returned to Ansar as assistant coach to Jamal Taha. Both Hassoun and Taha submitted their resignation on 11 September 2016, following Ansar's 5–2 defeat to Salam Zgharta in the first round of the 2016–17 season.

On 10 October 2016, Hassoun was appointed head coach of Shabab Sahel. He became coach of Second Division side Shabab Arabi on 3 February 2018, resigning only one month later on 5 March citing administrative reasons. Hassoun was appointed head coach of Shabab Bourj in the Second Division ahead of the 2018–19 season. He helped them gain promotion to the Lebanese Premier League for the first time.

Ahead of the 2019–20 Lebanese Second Division, Hassoun was appointed head coach of Ahli Saida. He remained in charge until 2021. On 24 June 2022, Hassoun became head coach of Lebanese Premier League side Tadamon Sour.

Style of play 
Hassoun was known for his free kicks, with over 80% of his goals coming from free kicks. He was also known for his accurate passing.

Honours

Player
Ansar
 Lebanese Premier League: 1997–98, 1998–99, 2005–06, 2006–07
 Lebanese FA Cup: 1998–99, 2001–02, 2005–06, 2006–07, 2009–10
 Lebanese Elite Cup: 1997, 2000
 Lebanese Federation Cup: 1999, 2000
 Lebanese Super Cup: 1997, 1998, 1999

Individual
 Lebanese Premier League Best Goal: 1997–98
 Lebanese Premier League Team of the Season: 1997–98

References

External links
 
 
 

1975 births
Living people
People from Sidon District
Lebanese footballers
Association football midfielders
Chabab Ghazieh SC players
Al Ansar FC players
Lebanese Premier League players
Lebanon international footballers
Lebanese football managers
Al Ansar FC managers
Chabab Ghazieh SC managers
Shabab Al Sahel FC managers
Al Shabab Al Arabi Club Beirut managers
Shabab El Bourj SC managers
Al Ahli Saida SC managers
Safa SC managers
Tadamon Sour SC managers
Lebanese Premier League managers
Lebanese Second Division managers
Association football coaches